Göran Thorell (born 24 May 1954 in Bromma, Stockholm, Sweden) is a Swedish actor. He studied at the Swedish National Academy of Mime and Acting.

Selected filmography
2012 - The Hypnotist
2005 - Wallander – Afrikanen
2004 - Om Stig Petrés hemlighet (TV)
2002 - Beck – Enslingen
2000 - Den bästa sommaren
2000 - Pelle Svanslös och den stora skattjakten
1997 - Peter-No-Tail (TV)
1997 - Beck – Lockpojken
1990 - The Rabbit Man

References

External links

Living people
1954 births
Male actors from Stockholm